Essina was an ancient Proto-Somali emporium located on the southeastern coast of Somalia in the Horn of Africa.

History

Having risen to prominence in the 2nd century CE, Essina was mentioned in Ptolemy's Geographia. Several modern scholars have positioned the ancient harbour in the vicinity of the early medieval cities of Merca and Barawa in modern-day southern Somalia based on Ptolemy's work. Alternatively, it has been suggested that Essina was buried somewhere along the Benadir coast. However, due to a general lack of excavations in the area, the old city's exact geographical location is unknown.

See also
Sarapion
Toniki
Malao
Opone
Mosylon
Mudun
Damo
Heis
Hannassa
Gondershe
Qandala
Miandi

References

Former populated places in Somalia
Ancient Somalia
City-states
African civilizations
Jubaland
Ancient Greek geography of East Africa